Sare Jahan se Accha is a pencil sketch mural in Ahmednagar city in Maharashtra, India. It was created in the year 1997. The sketch was drawn by Pramod Kamble, who is a painter and sculptor. He created it as a tribute to the nation on the occasion of 50 years of independence. It was painted on the specially-prepared wall of Mahavir Art Gallery in Ahmednagar. Kamble has portrayed Bharat Mata (goddess of Indian Independence) and 500 great people born out of Indian culture. It is said to be the world's biggest pencil sketch. This is the only fixed asset in India which was made as a part of India's 50th Independence day celebration.

Background
The project was started with the vision of contributing on the occasion of the 50th year of Indian independence. Drawing the attention of tourists to Ahmadnagar was also one of the aims.  Initially, it was decided to depict the struggle of Indian Independence.  Later it was decided to draw pictures of great Indian personalities. A team of friends from various fields helped Kamble to finalize the list of people to be included.  Sketches of 250 people were initially planned, which grew to number 500. The people were categorized into sages, deities, freedom fighters, Bharat Ratna awardees, Dadasaheb Phalke awardees, GyanPeeth awardees, Param Vir Chakra recipients and masters in various fields including sportspersons, musicians, dancers, painters, theater personalities, singers, social activists, and pioneer industrialists. Various sources including encyclopedias, magazines, and books were used. Sakal, a Marathi newspaper, helped to get some rare sketches which were not easily available.

Project execution
The project preparation started in 1996. The actual work of drawing the pencil sketch started in May 1997. It was completed on the eve of Independence Day, 1997 (15 August 1997). It took 72 consecutive days, which was 1728 hours of work. Kamble dedicated three months to the project. He had to work at night to reduce disturbance from street watchers. The artist believes that the pencil sketch was the turning point in his life. Expenses for the painting were 500,000 Rs. It included preparation and painting of the wall to prepare it for pencil drawing. Swati Kamble, Mandar Kulkarni had supported the identification of the right people for the drawing as a part of the project. The pencils required for the sketch were provided by Camlin, a pencil company. The drawing turned out very nicely due to this and with right contribution and support to Kamble by members.

Project details
The top of the sketch comprises the sages. These include Ram, Krishna, Vyas, Dnyaneshwar, Tukaram, Gautam Buddha, Gurunanak, etc. The Bharat Mata at the center is holding the tri-colour map of India. The Bharat Mata represents the country of India. The later part contains freedom fighters of India. The Bharat Ratna laureates are beside that. Various sports personalities are drawn on the left side and singers and musical artists are drawn on the right. Sketches of the artists (like dancers) are made along with their poses. Sketches of musical artists are made along with their musical instruments. For easy identification, sport personalities are also drawn in their famous poses or with sport equipment. No watercolor or any special material was used for the project.

Special attributes
 Largest pencil sketch in India
 No use of eraser during the sketch
 72 consecutive days, 1728 hours of work
 The sketch comprises 500 personalities on a single wall

Important personalities depicted

Social reformers

Independence activists

Musical artists

Classical singers

Sports personalities

Jnanpith Award winners

Bharat Ratna laureates

Dadasaheb Phalke Award winners

Param Vir Chakra recipients

References

Sources
 Article: "Kathyakoot te Chitrakoot", Magazine: Chinh – Diwali special edition year 2005
 Maharashtra Times newspaper dated 15 August 1998
 Article: "Kalasakt Avliya", Book: Achievers
 Article: "Takiche Ghav Sosta....", Paper: Dainik Ekmat, dated 10 August 2009 by Bhagwan Rautr
 "Kalajagtacha Kohinoor" by Bal J. Bothe, paper – Sakal
 Drushyakala Khand – Shilpakar Charitrakosh: Pramod Kamble

20th-century drawings
Public art in India
Murals in India